František Jakubec (12 April 1956 – 27 May 2016) was a Czech football player.

Jakubec played for Bohemians Prague for most of his career. He also had a spell with Veria in the Greek Super League.

He played for Czechoslovakia national football team (25 matches) and was a non-playing member of their squad at the 1982 FIFA World Cup.

References

External links

  ČMFS entry

1956 births
2016 deaths
Czech footballers
Czechoslovak footballers
1982 FIFA World Cup players
Czechoslovakia international footballers
Bohemians 1905 players
Veria F.C. players
Expatriate footballers in Greece
AC Bellinzona players
Czechoslovak expatriate footballers
Expatriate footballers in Switzerland
Czechoslovak expatriate sportspeople in Greece
Czechoslovak expatriate sportspeople in Switzerland
Association football defenders